Ben Underwood may refer to:
 Ben Underwood (footballer) (1901–1958), English footballer
 Ben Underwood (1992–2009), American echolocator

Diagnosed with retinal cancer at the age of two, Ben Underwood had his eyes removed at the age of three. He was able to detect the location of objects by making frequent clicking noises with his tongue.
He used it to accomplish such feats as running, playing basketball, riding a bicycle, rollerblading, playing football, and skateboarding